The Anglican Diocese of Ile-Oluji is one of twelve within the Anglican Province of Ondo, itself one of 14 provinces within the Church of Nigeria: the current bishop is Abel Oluyemi Ajibodu; a former Dean of the Diocese of Lagos West, Ajibodu was consecrated bishop on 24 July 2016 at Archbishop Vinning Memorial Church Cathedral, Ikeja.

References

Church of Nigeria dioceses
Dioceses of the Province of Ondo